Dan Williams (born 1 February 1989) is a rugby union footballer, who played for US Colomiers in the French Pro D2. He plays as a flanker. He started his career with Gloucester Rugby and as a member of the Gloucester Academy he was also registered to play for Moseley, and did so on several occasions, most notably in the EDF National Trophy Final of 2009, where he won a winners medal. He also played on loan for London Welsh in the Championship. Williams was released by US Colomiers at the end of season 2012–13 and finished his professional career at Plymouth Albion in the RFU National League 1. He is currently the Head Coach at Torquay Athletic RFC based in South Devon.

References

External links
 Gloucester Profile
 England Profile

1989 births
Living people
British rugby union players
Gloucester Rugby players
London Welsh RFC players
Moseley Rugby Football Club players
Plymouth Albion R.F.C. players
Rugby union flankers